Nallampatti is a panchayat town in Erode district in the Indian state of Tamil Nadu.

Demographics
In 2001, Nallampatti had a population of 3670. Males constituted 51% of the population and females 49%. Nallampatti had an average literacy rate of 54%, lower than the then national average of 59.5%: male literacy was 66% and female literacy was 42%. Eight per cent of the population was under 6 years of age.

Nallampatti is a good cultivation area in Erode.

References

Cities and towns in Erode district